The Archdiocese of Omaha is Latin Church ecclesiastical territory or diocese of the Catholic Church in the United States. Its current archbishop, George Joseph Lucas, was installed in Omaha on July 22, 2009. The archdiocese serves more than 230,000 Catholics in approximately 140 parishes and missions.  It includes 23 counties in northeast Nebraska: Boyd, Holt, Merrick, Nance, Boone, Antelope, Knox, Pierce, Madison, Platte, Colfax, Stanton, Wayne, Cedar, Dixon, Dakota, Thurston, Cuming, Dodge, Burt, Washington, Douglas, and Sarpy.

History
On January 6, 1857 Pope Pius IX established the Apostolic Vicariate of Nebraska from the Apostolic Vicariate of Indian Territory (East of the Rocky Mountains).  The Rev. James Myles O'Gorman, O.C.S.O., from New Melleray Monastery near Dubuque, Iowa, was named the Apostolic Vicar on January 28, 1859. The Vicariate lost territory when the Apostolic Vicariate of Montana was created in 1883. (This later developed as the Roman Catholic Diocese of Helena.) 

The Nebraska vicariate was elevated to a diocese and renamed as the Diocese of Omaha by Pope Leo XIII on October 2, 1885. Reverend James O'Connor was appointed as its first bishop. At the time, the diocese included all of Nebraska and Wyoming. It lost territory on August 2, 1887 when the dioceses of Cheyenne and Lincoln were established.  

The diocese lost territory two more times: to the Diocese of Kearney in 1912 when it was created, and again in 1916. Omaha was elevated to an archdiocese by Pope Pius XII on August 10, 1945.

Sexual abuse scandal of 20th and 21st centuries

The Archdiocese of Omaha has been implicated in the widespread scandal of sexual abuse by clergy in the Catholic church in the United States and earlier institutional coverups of actions. In 2018, the Archdiocese of Omaha released the names of 38 priests and other clergy members who have been credibly accused of sexual misconduct, an action requested by the state’s top prosecutor. At least two men on the list had been convicted and served prison sentences for molesting children.  

Among those listed was Daniel Herek, a former Omaha priest who was defrocked, convicted and sentenced to prison in 1999 for sexually assaulting and videotaping a 14-year-old boy.  He also served jail time several years later for exposing himself in an Omaha parking lot. John Fiala, who left the Omaha Archdiocese in 1996, was among those listed. Fiala died in 2017 in a Texas prison after being convicted of sexually abusing a teenage boy and of trying to hire a hit man to kill the victim. 

Though the earliest incident of abuse on record was alleged to have happened in 1956, the Archdiocese of Omaha has acknowledged that it did not record reports of sexual abuse until 1978. In a written statement published together with the list of accused clergy, Omaha Archbishop George Joseph Lucas wrote, 
"We acknowledge this report with sorrow, and know that it will cause a great deal of pain.” He continued, "We’re deeply saddened so many innocent minors and young adults were harmed by the church’s ministers. To victims and their families, I am sorry for the pain, betrayal and suffering you have experienced in the church.”

Bishops

Bishops of Omaha
 James Myles O'Gorman (1859-1874)
 James O.Connor (1876–1890)
 Richard Scannell (1891–1916)
 Jeremiah James Harty (1916–1927), Archbishop (personal title)
 Joseph Francis Rummel (1928–1935), appointed Archbishop of New Orleans

Archbishops of Omaha
 James Hugh Ryan (1935–1947)
 Gerald Thomas Bergan (1947–1969)
 Daniel E. Sheehan (1969–1993)
 Elden Francis Curtiss (1993–2009)
 George Joseph Lucas (2009–present)

Auxiliary bishops
 Daniel E. Sheehan (1964–1969), appointed Archbishop here
 Anthony Michael Milone (1981–1987), appointed Bishop of Great Falls-Billings

Other priests of this diocese who became bishops
 Blase Joseph Cupich, appointed Bishop of Rapid City in 1998; future Cardinal
 William Joseph Dendinger, appointed Bishop of Grand Island in 2004
 Joseph Gerard Hanefeldt, appointed Bishop of Grand Island in 2015
 Edward Joseph Hunkeler, appointed Bishop of Grand Island in 1945
 Patrick Aloysius Alphonsus McGovern, appointed Bishop of Cheyenne in 1912
 John Linus Paschang, appointed Bishop of Grand Island in 1951

Parishes

Omaha Catholic schools
The Omaha Catholic Schools is a school district in and around Omaha which is part of the Archdiocese of Omaha.  All schools are accredited or approved by the state of Nebraska.  The school district is composed of 54 elementary schools, one private 4th-8th grade school, four corporation high schools, three K-12th grade schools, one special needs K-12th grade school, and ten private high schools.  Over 20,000 students attend Omaha Catholic Schools each year.

Suffragan sees

Diocese of Grand Island
Diocese of Lincoln

See also

 Catholic Church by country
 Catholic Church in the United States
 Ecclesiastical Province of Omaha
 Education in Omaha, Nebraska
 Global organisation of the Catholic Church
 List of the Catholic dioceses of the United States
 List of churches in Omaha, Nebraska
 List of Roman Catholic archdioceses (by country and continent)
 List of Roman Catholic dioceses (alphabetical) (including archdioceses)
 List of Roman Catholic dioceses (structured view) (including archdioceses)
 Notre Dame Academy and Convent
 Sexual abuse scandal in Omaha archdiocese

References

External links
Roman Catholic Archdiocese of Omaha official site

 
Omaha
Education in Omaha, Nebraska
Religious organizations established in 1857
Omaha
1857 establishments in Nebraska Territory
Christianity in Omaha, Nebraska